Maksim Vyacheslavovich Martusevich (born 7 March 1995) is a Russian football midfielder.

Career

CSKA Moscow reserves
Born in Moscow, Martusevich passed the youth school of PFC CSKA. When he was 17, he started playing for reserves, which included players under 21 years. He was also with the first team until 2015, but did not make an official debut. He made 3 appearances in NextGen Series and 7 UEFA Youth League playing for U19 team from 2012 to 2014.

Javor Ivanjica
Martusevich moved to Serbian SuperLiga side and signed with Javor Ivanjica the last day of summer transfer period 2015. He made his debut for new club in 13 fixture of the 2015–16 Serbian SuperLiga season, versus Mladost Lučani. He also scored a goal in a cup match against Novi Pazar.

Leiria
On 8 February 2017, he joined a Portuguese club União de Leiria.

Vizela
On 8 January 2019, he moved to another Portuguese club Vizela.

Khimki
He made his Russian Premier League debut for FC Khimki on 8 August 2020 in a game against PFC CSKA Moscow.

References

External links
 
 
 Maksim Martusevich stats at utakmica.rs
 Maksim Martusevich stats at footballdatabase.eu
 
 

1995 births
Living people
Footballers from Moscow
Russian footballers
Russia youth international footballers
Association football midfielders
PFC CSKA Moscow players
FK Javor Ivanjica players
U.D. Leiria players
F.C. Vizela players
FC Khimki players
FC SKA-Khabarovsk players
FC Rotor Volgograd players
Serbian SuperLiga players
Russian Premier League players
Russian expatriate footballers
Russian expatriate sportspeople in Serbia
Expatriate footballers in Serbia
Expatriate footballers in Portugal